Taibach Rugby Football Club are a Welsh rugby union club based in Taibach of Port Talbot in Wales, UK. The club is a member of the Welsh Rugby Union and is also a feeder club for the Ospreys.

Taibach RFC were the winners of the inaugural Glamorgan County Silver Ball Trophy competition during the 1956-57 season beating Skewen RFC.

Youth policy 

Current Junior & Mini Section Coaches.

Dev / U7, U8’s - Dean Scully, Stuart Evans, Chris Thomas

Under 9’s - Sam Coombes, Dafydd Johnston, Marcus Francis

Under 10's - Phil Evans, Stuart Mason, Mike Kelly, Ryan Thomas

Under  12’s - Matthew Hare, Andrew Roche, Gary Jenkins, Carl Hillier

Under 15’s - Rob Shaw, Simon Rees, Anthony Terry, Steve Lloyd, Andrew Morris, Alan Davies

Junior Section Coordinator- Simon Rees

Taibach has a history of producing young talent. Coached by Phill Terry and Steve Gadd the 1999-2003 team were a success. In recent years Taibach have produced two full British Lions, James Hook and Richard Hibbard, as well as three Welsh youth player (under 18's) Michael Kelly, Matthew Bradley and Richard Hibbard.

In 1999 no fewer than seven Taibach youth players gained international honours with the 'Boys Club of Wales' Andrew Gadd (Captain), Matthew Bradley, Richard Hibbard, Michael Kelly, Andrew Redmore, Daniel Cumberlin and Craig Harding.

In the youth team's first year, the young side finished second, losing a title decider on the last game of the season to Tonmawr, and losing in the final of the Neath/Port talbot cup to Aberavon.

In their second season the team proved to be unbeatable in the league, winning 18 out of 18 games and narrowly losing, again to Aberavon, in the cup final. The season saw notable performances from Michael Kelly, Matthew Rowland, Richard Lewis, and Richard Hibbard with Matthew Bradley and Mark Fender finishing joint top scorers with 26 tries apiece.

The final season saw the team promoted to the 'Premier' league of youth rugby, but a mix of injuries, international call ups and college rugby affected the team's results, who finished mid table and lost both cup final semi finals to Skewen and Resolven. The team did however claim the Neath/Port Talbot 7's and 10's tournaments.

The club have a vibrant Junior & Mini Section made up of under a teams including:- Development Squad, Under 7's, 8's, 9’s, 10's, 12's and U15’s. The mini section of Taibach RFC are nicknamed "The Tiger Cubs".

Club honours
Glamorgan County Silver Ball Trophy 1957 - Champions

Notable former players

International players
 Richard Hibbard
 James Hook
 Dan Jones
 Trevor Lloyd
 William Mainwaring
 Alan McCarley
 Bryn Phillips
 Walter Vickery
 Evan Williams
 Gerwyn Williams
 Andrew Millward

Senior players
Players who went on to represent 'Premiership' clubs at senior levels are.

 Swansea RFC- Richard Hibbard, Matthew Bradley, Mark Fender, Richard Lewis
 Aberavon RFC- Denzil Jones, James Jones, Matthew Bradley, Michael Kelly, Mark Fender
 Bridgend RFC-Michael Kelly
 Neath RFC-James Hook
 Ospreys-James Hook, Richard Hibbard

Notes

Welsh rugby union teams
Rugby union in Neath Port Talbot